Las Locuras del profesor is a 1979 Argentine comedy film directed by Palito Ortega.

Cast

Carlos Balá - Profesor Socrates Perez
Javier Portales - Señor De Ulloa
Raúl Rossi - Director
Nené Malbrán - Profesora Susana
Tino Pascali - Profesor Química
Palito Ortega - Mozo

External links
 

1979 films
Argentine comedy films
1970s Spanish-language films
1970s Argentine films